Each year, USA Today, an American newspaper, awards outstanding high-school baseball players with a place on its All-USA High School Baseball Team. The newspaper names athletes whom they believe to be the best baseball players from high schools across the United States.  The newspaper has named a team every year since 1998.

In 1989, USA Today began naming an annual USA Today High School Baseball Player of the Year and an annual USA Today High School Baseball Coach of the Year.

In 1998, the paper also began naming an annual USA Today All-USA High School Baseball Team of nine to 11 players, with one member of the team designated the USA Today High School Baseball Player of the Year.

USA Today High School Players and Coaches of the Year (1989–1997)
See footnote

1995 team
Coach of the Year: Phil Clark (Germantown High School, Germantown, TN)

Hutchinson did not sign with the Braves, who drafted him with the 26th pick of the 1995 draft in the 1st round. Re-entered the MLB draft after attending Stanford and was selected with the 48th pick of the 1998 draft in the 2nd round by the Cardinals.
Hood did not sign with the Twins, who drafted him with the 100th pick of the 1995 draft in the 4th round. Re-entered the MLB draft after attending Georgia Tech and was selected with the 181st pick of the 1998 draft in the 6th round by the Angels.
Valent did not sign with the Tigers, who drafted him with the 714th pick of the 1995 draft in the 26th round. Re-entered the MLB draft after attending UCLA and was selected with the 42nd pick of the 1998 draft in the supplemental 1st round by the Phillies.
Newton Did not sign with the Pittburg Pirates

Player, Coach, and Team of the Year (1998–2003)
See footnote
Note: The first player (in boldface) in each list is the Player of the Year for that season.

1998 team
Coach of the Year: James Patrick (Clovis High School, Clovis, California)

 Henson attended Michigan on a football scholarship while playing in the Yankees minor league system. Retired from baseball in 2004 to pursue football career full-time.
 Teixeira did not sign with the Red Sox, who drafted him with the 265th pick of the 1998 draft in the 9th round. Re-entered the MLB draft after attending Georgia Tech and was selected 5th overall in the 2001 draft by the Rangers.

1999 team
Coach of the Year: Rocky Manuel (Bellaire High School, Houston, TX)

 Osborn did not sign with the Anaheim Angels (now the Los Angeles Angels) who drafted him with 671st Pick of the 1999 draft in the 22nd round. Re-enter the MLB draft after attending University of Florida and was selected 72nd Pick of the 2002 draft in the 2nd Round by the Indians.

2000 team
Coach of the Year: Sam Blalock (Rancho Bernardo High School, San Diego, CA)

 Harrington did not signed with Rockies and re-enter in the MLB Draft the following year.

2001 team
Coach of the Year: Kenny Kendrena (Bishop Amat High School, La Puente, CA)

 Putnam was not chosen in the 2001 MLB Draft. Re-enter the MLB draft after attending Stanford University and was selected 36th pick of the 2004 draft in the Supplemental 1st Round by the (A's).
 Crosby was drafted as the 53rd Pick of the 2001 MLB Draft of 2nd Round by Royals and attended Clemson University on a football scholarship. Played briefly in Royal's minor league system before deciding in returning to Clemson to pursue football full-time.

2002 team
Coach of the Year: Rick Carpenter (Elkins High School, Missouri City, TX)

Clement did not signed with Twins who drafted him with 362nd pick of the 2002 draft in the 12th round. Re-enter the MLB draft after attending USC and was selected 5th pick of the 2005 draft in the 1st Round by the Mariners.
Mayberry did not signed with Mariners who drafted him with 28th pick of the 2002 draft in the 1st round. Re-enter the MLB draft after attending Stanford University and was selected 19th pick of the 2005 draft in the 1st Round by the Rangers.

2003 team
Coach of the Year: Tom Meusborn (Chatsworth High School, Chatsworth, CA)

Player, Coach, and Team of the Year (2004–present)
See footnote
Note: The 2004–2007 teams were selected by USA Today's Christopher Lawlor after consultation with analysts, pro scouts, coaches and writers.
Note: The first player (in boldface) in each list is the Player of the Year for that season.

2004 team
Coach of the Year: Bobby Howard (Columbus High School, Columbus, GA)

Taylor was not chosen in the 2004 MLB Draft. Re-enter the MLB draft after attending Stanford University and was selected 73rd Pick of the 2007 draft in the 5th Round by the Phillies.

2005 team
Coach of the Year: Tony Rasmus, Russell County (Seale, Alabama)

 Henry briefly played in the minor league systems of the Yankees and Phillies before pursuing basketball full-time by attending colleges at Memphis and Kansas.
Putnam did not sign with the Tigers, who drafted him with 1140th pick of the 2005 draft in the 38th round. Re-entered the MLB draft after attending University of Michigan and was selected 171st pick of the 2008 draft in the fifth round by the Indians.

2006 team
Coach of the Year: Ron Eastman (The Woodlands High School, The Woodlands, TX)

2007 team
Coach of the Year: Jerry Boatner (West Lauderdale High School, Collinsville, MS)

2008 team
Coach of the Year: Todd Fitz-Gerald (American Heritage School, Plantation, FL)

Cole did not sign with the Yankees, who drafted him with 28th pick of the 2008 draft in the 1st round. Re-entered the MLB draft after attending UCLA and was selected 1st pick of the 2011 draft in the First round by the Pirates.

2009 team
Coach of the Year: Phil Forbes (Menchville High School, Newport News, VA)

 John went Undrafted in 2009 MLB Draft and officially attended the Oklahoma in the fall of 2009. He re-entered the MLB draft after attending Oklahoma and was selected 214th pick of the 2012 draft in the 6th Round by the Tigers.
 Williams did not signed with Rangers who drafted him with 964th pick of the 2009 draft in the 32nd round. He re-entered the MLB draft after attending Middle Georgia College and was selected 319th pick of the 2010 draft in the 10th Round by the Cardinals.

2010 team
Coach of the Year: Larry Knight (Sumrall High School, Sumrall, MS)

 Bennett went Undrafted in 2010 MLB Draft and officially attending Tennessee in the fall of 2010. Will be eligible to re-enter the MLB Draft in 2013.
 Bryant did not signed with Blue Jays who drafted him with 546th pick of the 2010 draft in the 18th round by officially attending University of San Diego in the fall of 2010. Will be eligible to re-enter the MLB Draft in 2013.
 Covey did not signed with Brewers who drafted him with 14th pick of the 2010 draft in the 1st round by officially attending University of San Diego in the fall of 2010. Will be eligible to re-enter the MLB Draft in 2013.

2011 team
Coach of the Year: Rich Bielski (Archbishop McCarthy High School, Fort Lauderdale, FL)

 Cron did not sign with the Mariners, who drafted him with the 92nd pick of the 2011 draft in the 3rd round. He chose instead to attend TCU in the fall of 2011, and will be eligible to re-enter the MLB Draft in 2014.
 Mitsui did not sign with the Rays, who drafted him with the 390th pick of the 2011 draft in the 12th round. He chose to attend Washington in the fall of 2011, and will be eligible to re-enter the MLB Draft in 2014.
 Montgomery went undrafted in the 2011 MLB Draft. He chose to attend South Carolina in the fall of 2011, and will be eligible to re-enter the MLB Draft in 2014

2012 team
Coach of the Year: Nick Day (Bishop Gorman High School, Las Vegas, NV)

 Kaprelian did not sign with the Mariners, who drafted him with the 1211th pick of the 2012 draft in the 40th round. He chose instead to attend UCLA in the fall of 2012, and wasn't drafted by the New York Yankees in the first round of the MLB Draft in 2015.
 T. Hawkins did not sign with the Rays, who drafted him with the 392nd pick of the 2012 draft in the 12th round. He chose instead to attend Oklahoma in the fall of 2012, and will be eligible to re-enter the MLB Draft in 2015.
 Moore did not sign with the Yankees, who drafted him with the 787th pick of the 2012 draft in the 25th round. He chose instead to attend UCLA in the fall of 2012, and will be eligible to re-enter the MLB Draft in 2015.

See also

ABCA/Rawlings High School All-America Baseball Team
USA Today All-USA High School Basketball Team
USA Today All-USA High School Football Team
USA Today Minor League Player of the Year Award

References

External links
USA Today Index Page

Baseball trophies and awards in the United States
High school baseball in the United States
USA Today
Awards by newspapers
Awards established in 1998